The United Alignment of Nationalists was a right-wing political alliance in Greece formed to contest the 1946 elections. It consisted of the  People's Party, the National Liberal Party, the Reformist Party, the Royalist Party, the Panhellenic National Party, the Patriotic Union Party the Forward Political Group, the Party of Reconstruction and the Social Radical Union.

The alliance received 55% of the vote, winning 206 of the 354 seats in the Hellenic Parliament.

References

Defunct political party alliances in Greece
1940s in Greek politics
Political parties established in 1947
1946 establishments in Greece
Political parties disestablished in 1950
1950 disestablishments in Greece
Anti-communist parties